Brandi Poole (born November 22) is an assistant coach for Dallas Wings in the WNBA. Poole has previously spent time in the WNBA as an assistant coach with the Connecticut Sun and as the Director of Basketball Operations with the Portland Fire. She has also served time at the NCAA Division I level with Bowling Green, Indiana, Texas Tech, and West Virginia.

College career
Poole attended University of the South and was a member of the women's basketball program.  As a player, Poole was a three-time all-conference honoree and a three-year co-captain. She still ranks among the school's top 10 in career points and rebounds.

Coaching career

Portland Fire
Poole started her career as the Director of Operations for the WNBA's Portland Fire in 2000.

West Virginia
Following her stint with the Fire, Poole got into the coaching side and spent one year at West Virginia.

Bowling Green
Poole left West Virginia and joined Curt Miller's staff at Bowling Green, where she spent the 2001-2012 seasons there. At BGSU, Poole helped Miller win eight straight MAC regular-season titles, five MAC Tournament Championships, reach five NCAA tournaments, and become the only team in conference history to advance to the Sweet 16. BGSU set a conference record for wins in a season (31), had nine straight seasons with at least 21 wins, including four seasons with 28 or more wins, and had a winning percentage of .737 (258-92).

Indiana
When Miller left for the University of Indiana, Poole joined him again as an assistant coach for the Hoosiers.As recruiting coordinator, Poole helped assemble a top-30 class heading into the 2013-14 season. Following Miller's resignation in the Summer of 2014, Poole also left a few months later after not being retained.

Texas Tech
Poole was hired in September of 2014 by Candi Whitaker and the Texas Tech women's basketball team. Whitaker stated when she hired Poole, "I was impressed with how hard she works, how she builds relationships and how she's represented each program she's been with on and off the court." Poole spent four seasons with the Lady Raiders before she left to become an assistant coach in the WNBA.

Connecticut Sun
Poole reconnected with Miller once again when he hired her on February 20, 2018 to become an assistant coach on his staff in Connecticut. While with the Sun, Poole helped the team advance to the WNBA Finals two times during her tenure (2019, 2022). Connecticut tallied a record of 105 – 53 (.665), including a league-best 26-6 record during the 2021 season. The Sun also won 16 playoff games during her five seasons, tying Seattle for most wins during that span. Following the 2020 season, Poole was re-signed as an assistant coach to a multi-year deal to stay on staff. In the 2021 season with the Sun, Poole served as the acting head coach while Miller had to take a temporary leave to attend to a family matter.

Dallas Wings
Curt Miller left the Sun's heading coaching position to take a job in Los Angeles, so Poole once again was on the move. This time she found a position with the Dallas Wings as an assistant coach on Latricia Trammell's staff.

References

Connecticut Sun coaches
Dallas Wings coaches
Living people

Year of birth missing (living people)
Texas Tech Lady Raiders basketball coaches
Bowling Green Falcons women's basketball coaches
West Virginia Mountaineers women's basketball coaches
Indiana Hoosiers women's basketball coaches